738 Alagasta is a main belt asteroid orbiting the Sun. It was discovered from Heidelberg on 7 January 1913 by German astronomer Franz Kaiser. The asteroid was named in honor of Gau-Algesheim, previously Alaghastesheim, which is the home city of the discoverer's family. The orbital plane is inclined at an angle of 3.53° to the plane of the ecliptic.

The asteroid is roughly 63 km in diameter and has a low albedo.

See also
 List of minor planets/701–800
 Meanings of minor planet names: 501–1000

References

External links
 
 

Background asteroids
Alagasta
Alagasta
CGSU-type asteroids (Tholen)
19130107